William Wadsworth Evans (October 5, 1886 – November 1972) was an American Republican Party politician who served in the New Jersey General Assembly from 1919 to 1924.

Early life
Evans was born in Paterson, New Jersey on October 5, 1886, the son of John William Evans and Emily Wadsworth Evans. He is a 1905 graduate of Paterson High School and graduated from New York Law School in 1908. He was admitted to the New Jersey Bar in 1911. In 1912, Evans served as Secretary to New Jersey Assembly Speaker Thomas F. McCran.

State Assemblyman
He was elected Assemblyman in 1918, and was re-elected in 1919, 1920, 1921, 1922 and 1923. Evans served as Assembly Speaker in 1922.

Family and later life
Evans was married to Isabel Urquhart Blauvelt (1892–1967), the daughter of William B. Blauvelt, a Paterson banker. He had two children: Barbara Evans Boe (1914–1999) and William W. Evans, Jr. (1921–1999), a former New Jersey State Assemblyman and a candidate for the Republican nomination for President in 1968. He died in Allendale, New Jersey in 1972 at age 86.

References

Speakers of the New Jersey General Assembly
Republican Party members of the New Jersey General Assembly
New Jersey lawyers
New York Law School alumni
Politicians from Paterson, New Jersey
1886 births
1972 deaths
20th-century American politicians
20th-century American lawyers